Guido Enrico Tabellini (born January 26, 1956) is an Italian economist, rector of Bocconi University from November 2008 until July 2012.

Tabellini received his Laurea in 1980 from the University of Turin, and his Ph.D. in 1984 from UCLA. He first taught at Stanford, then at UCLA, and later in Italy. He is past president of the European Economic Association. He was consultant to the World Bank and Italian government.

In 2003 Tabellini published The Economic Effects of Constitutions. Munich Lectures in Economics.

In May 2008 he was appointed as rector of Bocconi University (Milan), in charge from 1 November 2008. He had left this position in 2012.

Awards and honors
 1987–1988 Political Economy Fellowship, Carnegie-Mellon University
 1987–1992 Faculty Research Fellow, NBER
 1987–now Research Fellow, CEPR
 1992–97, 2001–now Council of the European Economic Association
 1999 Distinguished Fellow, CES, University of Munich
 2001 Yrjö Jahnsson Award, European Economic Association, Lausanne
 2001 Fellow of the Econometric Society
 2001 Research Associate, CEPS, Bruxelles
 2001 International Research Fellow, Kiel Institute for World Economic Studies
 2003 Research Fellow, Canadian Institute of Economic Research
 2003 Foreign Honorary Member, American Academy of Arts and Sciences
 2005 Vicepresident, European Economic Association
 2006 Council of Econometric Society
 2007 President, European Economic Association
 2008–2012 Rector, Bocconi University
 2022 BBVA Foundation Frontiers of Knowledge Award

Works
 Political Economics – Explaining Economic Policy (with Torsten Persson), MIT Press, 2000.
 The Economic Effects of Constitutions (with Torsten Persson), MIT Press 2003.

References

External links
 Homepage at Bocconi University
 Guido Tabellini è il nuovo Rettore
 

1956 births
Living people
20th-century  Italian  economists
21st-century  Italian  economists
University of Turin alumni
University of California, Los Angeles alumni
Academic staff of Bocconi University
Place of birth missing (living people)
Fellows of the Econometric Society
Fellows of the American Academy of Arts and Sciences
Fellows of the European Economic Association